Sobra  is a port village in Croatia. It is connected by the D120 highway and by ferry.

Populated places in Dubrovnik-Neretva County
Mljet